Bridgend Athletic RFC are a Welsh rugby union club based in Bridgend in South Wales. They are members of the Welsh Rugby Union playing in the National League Division 1 West and are a feeder club for the Ospreys.

History

Bridgend Athletic RFC was reformed in 1972, after the Bridgend Youth team members in that year wanted to form a senior team so they didn't have to go their separate ways into senior rugby, hence the formation of the club which had previously existed up to 1939.  The club become full members of the Welsh Rugby Union in 1983.  1989 saw the creation of the club's mini and junior section which is renowned for being among the best in the country.  The club were promoted from Division 5 Central in 2001, were WRU Division Four East Champions in 2002, were then promoted from Division 3 to WRU Division Two West in 2003 through the league organisation and were promoted to Division 1 in 2004.  They have suffered relegation from that league once, but recovered in 2009, winning WRU Division Two West.
In 2012 they were included in the newly formed Swalec Championship, where they narrowly lost their opening game 28-29 to Bonymaen.

Club honours
 2001-02 WRU Division Four East - Champions
 2008-09 WRU Division Two West- Champions
 2008-09 Ospreys Cup Under 16 - Champions
 2008-09 Ospreys Cup Under 15 - Champions
 2008-09 Ospreys Cup Under 14 - Champions
 2008-09 Ospreys Cup Under 13 - Champions
 2008-09 Ospreys Cup Under 12 - Champions
 2014-15 [(Ospreys Cup)] Under 15 - Champions
 2015-16 [(National Youth Cup)] Youth - Champions

Notable players
Lee Byrne - British & Irish Lions, Wales RU, Ospreys, Clermont Auvergne, Dragons
Rhys Webb - Ospreys & Wales RU, British & Irish Lions
Scott Baldwin - Ospreys & Wales RU
Phil Price- Dragons
Tom Habberfield - Ospreys / Wales U20/Wales 7s
Matthew Morgan - Ospreys / Wales U20. Wales RU
Luke Morgan - Ospreys / Wales U20 / Wales 7s
Nicky Griffiths - Wales 7s
Lloyd Evans - Wales 7s
Adrian Durston -Bridgend & Wales RU
Matt Jones - Ospreys & Wales RU
Tom Prydie - Dragons & Wales RU
Josh Navidi - Cardiff Blues & Wales RU, British & Irish Lions

Coaches
 Director of Coaching: John Apsee
 Technical Consultant: Gerald Williams
 Backs Coach: Stuart Morris
 Forwards Coach: Dai Williams

References

Bridgend Athletic RFC

Rugby clubs established in 1939
Welsh rugby union teams
1939 establishments in Wales